David Ober is an American politician serving as a member of the Indiana Utility Regulatory Commission. Prior to joining the IURC, he represented the 82nd district of the Indiana House of Representatives.

Early life and education 
Ober is a sixth-generation Hoosier who grew up in rural Albion, Indiana. He graduated from Central Noble High School in 2005 and earned a Bachelor of Science degree in computer graphics technology from Purdue University Northwest in 2009.

Career

Indiana Legislature 
Ober was appointed by House Speaker Brian Bosma to serve on the Agriculture and Rural Development, Government and Regulatory Reform, and Employment, Labor and Pensions Committees during the 2013 session of the Indiana General Assembly. Ober was appointed to the House Ways and Means Committee in December 2013, to fill a vacancy left by the passing of Representative Phyllis Pond (R-New Haven).

Ober was appointed assistant majority whip for the 119th General Assembly.

On November 23, 2016, Ober was appointed Chairman of the House Committee on Utilities, Energy and Telecommunications for the 120th General Assembly.

Indiana Utility Regulatory Commission 
David Ober was appointed by Governor Eric Holcomb on April 2, 2018. He is a member of the NARUC Committee on Water and the Mid-America Regulatory Conference. He also serves as Secretary of the Board of Directors for the Organization of PJM States, Inc. (OPSI) and is vice-chair of the National Regulatory Research Institute (NRRI) Board of Directors.

Electoral history 

2012 Election
Ober was one of four candidates that ran for the vacant 82nd House district. The vacancy was due to the decennial redistricting of all state legislative and congressional districts in 2011. He won the May 8, 2012 Republican primary with 47% of the vote. In the November 6, 2012 general election, Ober defeated Democrat Mike Wilber to earn a first term in the Indiana House of Representatives.

2014 Election
Ober was unopposed in the May 6, 2014 Republican primary election. In the November 4, 2014 general election, Ober defeated Democrat Mike Wilber in a rematch to earn a second term in the Indiana House of Representatives.

References 

1987 births
Living people
Republican Party members of the Indiana House of Representatives
People from Albion, Indiana
Purdue University alumni
People from Kendallville, Indiana
21st-century American politicians